Piz Cavardiras (or Brichlig) is a 2,964 metres high mountain in the Glarus Alps, located on the border between the cantons of Uri and Graubünden. The Cavardiras hut, owned by the Swiss Alpine Club, lies near the pass of Cavardiras on the north side.

References

External links
Cavardiras hut SAC
Piz Cavardiras on Hikr.org

Mountains of the Alps
Mountains of Switzerland
Mountains of Graubünden
Mountains of the canton of Uri
Graubünden–Uri border
Two-thousanders of Switzerland
Tujetsch